Danebury Hill is a  biological Site of Special Scientific Interest north-east of Nether Wallop in Hampshire. It is part of Danebury Hillfort Local Nature Reserve.

This gently sloping site surrounds Danebury, which is a hill fort dating to the Iron Age. It has herb-rich chalk grassland which is grazed by rabbits and sheep, and there are also areas of mixed and juniper scrub. Flowering plants include the scarce burnt-tip orchid, field fleawort and frog orchid.

References

 
Sites of Special Scientific Interest in Hampshire